Yale Bulldogs ice hockey may refer to either of the ice hockey teams that represent Yale University:

Yale Bulldogs men's ice hockey
Yale Bulldogs women's ice hockey